Gong.bg is a sports media website based in Bulgaria. Over 80% of users are in Bulgaria, where it has an internet traffic rank of 35.

It was launched in 2007. The chief editor is Nikolai Alexandrov, a longstanding sports journalist with Darik Radio and Radio Gong.

References

External links 
 gong.bg

Bulgarian sport websites